Internacionale was a British clothing retailer with stores throughout the United Kingdom, including stores which were acquired from the former clothing chain MK One in 2008. It sold women's wear including dresses, tops, jeans, trousers, jackets and jewellery.

History

The company was created by Ken Cairnduff, a Scottish businessman in 1980 and grew to become known as Internacionale. The business was sold in 2006 to a management buyout, which at the time had 150 stores.

The company entered administration for the third time since 2008 on 28 February 2014. In September 2014, Edinburgh Woollen Mill agreed to purchase the intellectual property of Internacionale.

References

Clothing retailers of the United Kingdom
Companies that have entered administration in the United Kingdom
2014 disestablishments in the United Kingdom